Bodman PLC is a business law firm headquartered in Ford Field, located in downtown Detroit, Michigan. Founded in 1929 by two former Ford Motor Company lawyers, Wallace R. Middleton and Clifford B. Longley, the firm is one of the state’s largest, with more than 150 lawyers in five offices: Ann Arbor, Cheboygan, Detroit, Grand Rapids, and Troy.

Bodman has long been known for its close associations with the automotive and financial services industries and for its long-term relationships with significant clients. For example, the firm has maintained a continuous client relationship with members of the Ford family since 1929 and with Comerica Incorporated since it assisted in the formation of Manufacturer's National Bank, which later merged with Comerica, in 1933. The firm represents more than 80 financial institutions in Michigan and across the U.S. as well as Tier-1, -2 and -3 automotive suppliers and OEMs on a national and international basis.

Honors
Chambers USA: America’s Leading Lawyers for Business ranks Bodman as one of Michigan's leading law firms in six of the eight practices areas it evaluates in Michigan, including “Band 1 Ranking" in Banking in Finance & Bankruptcy/Restructuring. Other Bodman practice areas ranked in Chambers USA are Corporate/M&A, Commercial Litigation, Real Estate and Labor & Employment. Benchmark: Litigation ranks Bodman as “highly recommended” for commercial litigation, which is that publication’s highest ranking. Benchmark: Litigation has also named Bodman its 2020 Michigan Litigation Law Firm of the Year. 

Bodman has an extensive pro bono program and has received “Law Firm of the Year” honors from Legal Aid and Defender Association and from Michigan Community Resources for its commitment in this area. The State Bar of Michigan has also included Bodman on its 2020 State Bar of Michigan Pro Bono Honor Roll.

The Detroit Free Press recognized Bodman as one of the "top workplaces"  of southeast Michigan for 2016.  The firm was honored in 2010, 2015, and again in 2017 as a "Diversity Focused Company"  for inclusiveness and promoting community service, in addition to receiving the "Going Green Award  from Corp! Magazine for its sustainable business practices.

References

Law firms established in 1929
Law firms based in Detroit
1929 establishments in Michigan